National Highway 448, commonly called NH 448 is a national highway in  India. It is a spur road of National Highway 48. NH-448 traverses the state of Rajasthan in India. It connects Ajmer to Kishangarh Airport.

Route
Kishangarh - Ajmer - Nasirabad.

Junctions  

 Terminal near Kishangarh.
 near Ajmer.
 Terminal near Nasirabad.

See also 
 List of National Highways in India
 List of National Highways in India by state

References

External links 

 NH 448 on OpenStreetMap

National highways in India
National Highways in Rajasthan